American Memorial Park on the island of Saipan, Northern Mariana Islands, was created as a memorial honoring the sacrifices made during the Marianas Campaign of World War II.  Recreational facilities, a World War II museum and flag monument keep alive the memory of over 4,000 United States military personnel and local islanders who died in June 1944.

The park is owned by the Government of the Commonwealth of the Northern Mariana Islands, and the national memorial is managed in cooperation with the National Park Service as an affiliated area. It has facilities for baseball, bicycling, running, tennis, picnicking, and swimming.

See also
 List of national memorials of the United States

References

 The National Parks: Index 2001–2003. Washington: U.S. Department of the Interior.

External links
 Official NPS website: American Memorial Park

Protected areas established in 1978
Protected areas of Northern Mariana Islands
National Memorials of the United States
Landmarks in the Northern Mariana Islands
World War II memorials
Parks in Oceania